The Geist of Alec Empire is a 3 CD compilation album by electronic artist Alec Empire. While the majority of the album is tracks previously released on the Mille Plateaux label, some original material is present.

Track listing

CD 1
"22:24" - 4:44
a longer version of this song appears on Low On Ice, this version is approximately the same length as the music video.
"Kick Some Soul Pt. 2" - 5:58
previously released on the compilation Electric Ladyland
"Kick Some Soul Pt. 1" - 7:53
previously released on the compilation Electric Ladyland
"Kick Some Dirt Pt. 2" - 5:40
previously released on the compilation Electric Ladyland II
"I'm Gonna Die If I Fall Asleep Again" - 5:21
previously released on Hypermodern Jazz 2000.5
"God Told Me How To Kiss" - 6:52
previously released on Hypermodern Jazz 2000.5
"Many Bars And No Money" - 5:59
previously released on Hypermodern Jazz 2000.5
"___ (Low On Ice-Track 2)" - 6:41
previously released on Low On Ice
"Sweet" - 5:58
previously released on Limited Editions 1990-94
"3 Bullets In The Back" - 6:12
previously released on the compilation Electric Ladyland III
"City Of Lights" - 7:10
previously released on the compilation Electric Ladyland III as "Cities Of Light"

CD 2
"Sieg Über Die Mayday HJ" - 5:12
previously released on Generation Star Wars
"Get Some" - 5:38
previously released on Hypermodern Jazz 2000.5
"Low On Ice" - 7:53
previously released on Low On Ice
"The Backside Of My Brain" - 7:55
previously released on Limited Editions 1990-94
"Maschinenvolk" - 7:37
previously released on Generation Star Wars
"Civilisation Virus" - 13:28
previously released on Limited Editions 1990-94
"Metall Dub" - 6:58
previously released on Low On Ice
"13465" - 4:08
previously released on Generation Star Wars
"Stahl Und Blausäure" - 4:48
previously released on Generation Star Wars
"Lash The Nineties" - 8:23
a shorter version of a song previously released on Generation Star Wars

CD 3
"The Sun Hurts My Eyes" - 12:07
previously released on Limited Editions 1990-94
"The Report" - 7:16
previously unreleased, from the Philipp Virus short film The Report (1996)
"SuEcide" - 6:32
previously released on Limited Editions 1990-94
"___ (Low On Ice-Track 6)" - 5:50
previously released on Low On Ice
"Slowly Falling In Love" - 4:18
previously released on Hypermodern Jazz 2000.5
"Walk The Apocalypse" - 5:11
previously released on Hypermodern Jazz 2000.5
"La Ville De Filles Mortes" - 5:40
previously released on Les Étoiles des Filles Mortes
"Opus 28 - Pour La Liberté Des Milles Universes" - 6:10
previously released on Les Étoiles des Filles Mortes
"La Guerre D'Opium" - 6:15
previously released on Les Étoiles des Filles Mortes
"Swimming Through Nails" - 6:53
previously unreleased
"We Have Arrived" - 3:56
previously unreleased
"Clean Circuit" - 3:41
previously unreleased

Alec Empire albums
1997 compilation albums